This is a list of the National Register of Historic Places listings in Hardeman County, Texas.

This is intended to be a complete list of properties and districts listed on the National Register of Historic Places in Hardeman County, Texas. There are one district and one individual property listed on the National Register in the county. The district contains several Recorded Texas Historic Landmarks one of which is also a State Antiquities Landmark. The individual property is a Recorded Texas Historic Landmark.

Current listings

The locations of National Register properties and districts may be seen in a mapping service provided.

|}

See also

National Register of Historic Places listings in Texas
Recorded Texas Historic Landmarks in Hardeman County

References

External links

Hardeman County, Texas
Hardeman County
Buildings and structures in Hardeman County, Texas